Los Botados is a town in the Monte Plata province of the Dominican Republic.

Sources 
 – World-Gazetteer.com

Populated places in Monte Plata Province